Padre Diego Cera Avenue, or simply Diego Cera Avenue, is a major north-south collector road in Las Piñas, Metro Manila, Philippines. It is a four-lane undivided arterial running parallel to the Manila–Cavite Expressway to the west from Manuyo Uno at Las Piñas' border with Parañaque in the north to Zapote near the border with Bacoor in the south. It is a continuation of Elpidio Quirino Avenue from Parañaque and was originally a segment of Calle Real in Las Piñas. The road is a component of the National Route 62 (N62) of the Philippine highway network and   Radial Road 2 (R-2) of Manila's arterial road network. 

The avenue marks the original shoreline of Manila Bay in Las Piñas as it existed during the Spanish colonial period. Prior to the construction of the Coastal Road in 1985, the road served as the highway linking Manila with Cavite and other southern provinces.

The road is situated in the Las Piñas historical corridor being home to the city's oldest structures such as the Las Piñas Church, the Las Piñas Gabaldon Hall, and the old Las Piñas District Hospital. It was named for Fray Diego Cera de la Virgen del Carmen (1762–1832), the Spanish missionary from Huesca who designed and built the Bamboo Organ in 1824.

Route description

Diego Cera Avenue begins in barangay Manuyo Uno as a continuation of Elpidio Quirino Avenue south of Villareal Street running parallel to the Manila–Cavite Expressway to the west and Tramo Street to the east. It proceeds due south entering the old downtown barangays of Daniel Fajardo, Ilaya, and Elias Aldana where the old Las Piñas Municipal Hall and Las Piñas Church are located. Upon crossing the Las Piñas River via the Diego Cera Bridge, the avenue enters barangay Pulang Lupa Uno where the old Sarao Motors factory and the Las Piñas General Hospital are located. It intersects with Carlos Garcia Avenue Extension (C-5) and Naga Road before arriving in barangay Zapote. The avenue terminates at Alabang–Zapote Road near the city's boundary with Cavite where it continues as Aguinaldo Highway.

Other landmarks along the avenue include the Saint Joseph's Academy, Plaza Quezon, Las Piñas Catholic Cemetery, Maricielo Villas, and Zapote Public Market.

See also
 Del Pilar Street
 Harrison Avenue

References

Streets in Metro Manila